Sedrick Hodge (born September 13, 1978) is a former American football linebacker who played in the National Football League (NFL) for the New Orleans Saints from 2001 to 2005. He was drafted in the third round of the 2001 NFL Draft. He was signed by the Miami Dolphins before the 2006 season but was cut right before the season began.  Before his NFL career, Sedrick was a standout linebacker at The Westminster Schools in Atlanta and played college football at the University of North Carolina at Chapel Hill.

References

External links
 Just Sports Stats

1978 births
Living people
American football linebackers
New Orleans Saints players
North Carolina Tar Heels football players
The Westminster Schools alumni
People from Fayetteville, Georgia
Players of American football from Atlanta